Tamás Deák (born 31 May 1976), better known by his stage name Speak, is a rap artist, model and actor based in Hungary. He gained considerable fame after the music video for his 2003 anti-war song, "Stop the War", became popularized through video sharing websites. Speak lives in London, England.

"Stop the War" 
Speak is known primarily for his 2003 rap single "Stop the War". A video for this single appeared on YouTube, and featured other semi-famous musicians. Various commentators called the song unintentionally humorous. The song and music video were parodied on Saturday Night Live in a sketch starring Beck Bennett titled "World Peace Rap", broadcast 7 May 2017.

Notable collaborations 
On 20 June 2012, Speak announced on his website that he would be supporting Australian rap duet Hilltop Hoods and DJ Debris on their upcoming UK tour.

References

External links
http://www.speakmusic.hu/ Speak's Official Site

1976 births
Hungarian rappers
Living people
Musicians from Budapest